The 1972 William & Mary Indians football team represented the College of William & Mary as a member of the Southern Conference (SoCon) during the 1972 NCAA University Division football season. Led by Jim Root in his first year as head coach, William & Mary finished the season 5–6 overall and 4–2 in SoCon play to place third.

Schedule

References

William and Mary
William & Mary Tribe football seasons
William and Mary Indians football